was a town located in Sera District, Hiroshima Prefecture, Japan.

As of 2003, the town had an estimated population of 3,919 and a density of 56.68 persons per km². The total area was 69.14 km².

On October 1, 2004, Seranishi, along with the town of Kōzan (also from Sera District), was merged into the expanded town of Sera and no longer exists as an independent municipality.

External links
 Official website of Sera 

Dissolved municipalities of Hiroshima Prefecture